Archie Stevenot (September 25, 1882 – August 1, 1968) was a prominent citizen in Calaveras County, California and Supreme Noble Grand Humbug of E Clampus Vitus. Born in Carson Hill, Stevenot helped found the California Chamber of Commerce and his family established the borax industry in the state. He also established the Mother Lode Highway Association in 1919 which was primarily responsible for the creation of State Route 49. As a result, the bridge across the Stanislaus River between Tuolumne and Calaveras counties on SR 49 is named the Archie Stevenot Bridge in his honor, and his birthplace has been declared a California Historical Landmark (also found on SR 49).

References

1882 births
1968 deaths
Businesspeople from California
People from Calaveras County, California
20th-century American businesspeople